Pipehill is a hamlet and former civil parish, now in the parish of Hammerwich, in the Lichfield district, in the county of Staffordshire, England. It is located between Wall and Hammerwich. In 1891 the parish had a population of 139.

The village consists of farms, housing, petrol station, offices and Pipehills Fisheries.

There is an hourly bus service that runs through Pipehill from Lichfield to Walsall via Walsall Wood and Aldridge. The nearest railway station is Lichfield City. The now disused South Staffordshire Line ran through Pipehill with a station at Hammerwich. This station closed in 1965 and the line in 2002. Although the section to Brownhills and Walsall was closed in 1984.

Pipehill also has a former toll house on Walsall Road which is now in private ownership. The nearest churches is in Wall and Hammerwich.

History 
Pipehill was formerly a township in the parish of Lichfield St Michael, from 1866 Pipehill was a civil parish in its own right, in 1894 the parish was abolished and merged with Wall and Lichfield St Michael.

References

Sources
Townships: Wall with Pipehill | British History Online
Pipehill, Staffordshire - genealogy heraldry and history
Pipe Hill – Lichfield Lore
Pipehill Fisheries
Wall

Hamlets in Staffordshire
Former civil parishes in Staffordshire
Lichfield District